Polyipnus meteori is a species of ray-finned fish in the genus Polyipnus found in the Indian and Pacific Oceans.

References 

Sternoptychidae
Taxa named by Adolf Kotthaus
Fish described in 1967